The Jimenez Novia W16 is a French one off sports car built in 1995 by Ramon Jimenez, a French motorcycle racer from Vaucluse. It reportedly cost £600,000 ($855,000) and took ten years to develop. It features an aerodynamic body with center locking wheels, scissor doors and carbon fiber parts which Jimenez developed himself.

History 
Jimenez built the Novia as a tribute to the Porsche 917 race car, starting work in 1985 with the help of a small team of engineers in his workshop in Avignon. France. Before building the car, Jimenez acquired the materials needed to fabricate his own carbon fiber composite panels from scratch. Jimenez continued to test and develop it, planning additional performance upgrades. However, he wasn't able to as the French government mandated that a separate chassis be made for the purpose of crash testing. It is reported that Jimenez was also working on a possible off road version of the Novia for production at the time.

Performance 
The Novia is powered by a mid mounted 4.1L W16 engine that was made by combining four Yamaha FZR1000 1.0 liter 4 cylinder motorcycle engines. It has 4 rows of cylinders with 4 cylinders in each row and a total of 80 valves (5 valves per cylinder). It also uses two crankshafts, unlike the W16 found in the Bugatti Veyron. Some sources argue however that the layout of the powerplant with four rows of cylinders arranged in two Vs wasn't a true W engine as it didn't fit the "broad arrow" layout of other W engines. The finished engine produces 417.6 kW (567 PS, 560 bhp) at 10,000 rpm and 432 nm (318.6 lb ft of torque), with power sent to the rear wheels through a 6-speed manual transmission. During a speed run on a section of the A7 highway in France that had been closed by local officials, the Novia reached a verified top speed of 380 km/h (236 mph). The car can reportedly accelerate from 0-60 mph (97 km/h) in 3.1 seconds and complete a 1000 meter sprint in 19 seconds. Notably, the Novia was one of the first cars to be powered by a W16 engine, preceding the Veyron’s use of one by ten years.

Specifications 
The Novia uses an aluminium honeycomb monocoque chassis, with a custom carbon fiber body designed to pay tribute to the first iteration of the Porsche 917K race car. The interior is accessed via scissor doors and features cream-colored Connolly leather, twin bucket seats with racing harnesses, radio/cassette player, ashtray and air conditioning. It also features electronic traction control and adjustable hydraulic suspension.

References

Sports cars
Concept cars
Rear mid-engine, rear-wheel-drive vehicles
Cars of France
Cars introduced in 1995